Raymond Leslie Martin  (3 February 1926 – 25 February 2020) was an Australian chemistry professor and university administrator. He was Vice-Chancellor of Monash University from 1977 to 1987.

Early life 

Martin grew up in Melbourne where he attended Scotch College Melbourne from grade 6 until attaining his Leaving Certificate. His father had to move suddenly to Sydney for work reasons, and whilst in Sydney Martin attended North Sydney Boys' High School for a year before returning to Melbourne for his tertiary education.  His tertiary education was at the University of Melbourne and the University of Cambridge. He was an outstanding student, receiving numerous prizes and scholarships. He gained two doctorates from Cambridge and one doctorate from the Australian National University, all in chemistry.

Professional career 

In the 1950s, Martin was appointed lecturer at the University of New South Wales, before being appointed professor of chemistry at Melbourne University at just 36 years of age. During this time, he worked in private industry, and was also a visiting scholar at Columbia University. In 1972, he moved to ANU, where he was Dean of the Research School of Chemistry. In 1984 Martin was elected chairman of the International Atomic Weights Commission where he served until 1987.

In 1977, Martin was appointed the third Vice-Chancellor of Monash University. The position was originally intended to go to a British academic, Lord John Vaizey. However, negotiations between Vaizey and the University broke down after Vaizey's demands became increasingly outlandish. As a result, the position went to Martin, after founding Dean of Arts Bill Scott filled the vacancy for a year. 

His leadership at Monash consolidated the extraordinary growth achieved by the University. In a sense, his vice-chancellorship was much quieter than the pioneering of Louis Matheson or the massive expansion of Mal Logan. This was partly because funding for Australian universities slowed during his tenure, while no major educational reforms were made by Australian governments. 

When he stepped down from the lead role at Monash, he worked as a professor of chemistry at the University, before moving to Canberra to work in the Prime Minister's Department as Chair of the Australian Science and Technology Council.

References 

1926 births
2020 deaths
Fellows of the Australian Academy of Science
People educated at Scotch College, Melbourne
University of Melbourne alumni
Academic staff of Monash University
Academic staff of the University of New South Wales
Academic staff of the University of Melbourne
Australian National University alumni
Alumni of the University of Cambridge
Officers of the Order of Australia
Fellows of the Australian Academy of Technological Sciences and Engineering
People educated at North Sydney Boys High School